Jeremie Joseph Dufault (born 1978) is an American attorney, businessman, and politician serving as a member of the Washington House of Representatives from the 15th district. Elected in 2018, Dufault's district includes the eastern half of Yakima County.

Early life and education 
Dufault was born in Selah, Washington and raised in Yakima, Washington, where attended A.C. Davis High School. A member of the United States Army Reserve, Dufault served in Kuwait and Afghanistan. He was also a member of the Judge Advocate General's Corps. Dufault graduated from the University of Pennsylvania and earned a Juris Doctor from Harvard Law School.

Career 
After returning to Yakima, Washington, Dufault became a real estate developer, specializing in senior, student, and family housing. Dufault was elected to the Washington House of Representatives in 2018 and took office on January 14, 2019.

Awards 
 2020 Guardians of Small Business. Presented by NFIB.

References 

Republican Party members of the Washington House of Representatives
United States Army personnel of the War in Afghanistan (2001–2021)
University of Pennsylvania alumni
Harvard Law School alumni
People from Yakima County, Washington
People from Selah, Washington
Living people
21st-century American politicians
1978 births